The four kingdoms of Daniel are four kingdoms which, according to the Book of Daniel, precede the "end-times" and the "Kingdom of God".

The four kingdoms

Historical background 
The Book of Daniel originated from a collection of legends circulating in the Jewish community in Babylon and Mesopotamia in the Persian and early Hellenistic periods (5th to 3rd centuries BC), and was later expanded by the visions of chapters 7–12 in the Maccabean era (mid-2nd century).

The "four kingdoms" theme appears explicitly in Daniel 2 and Daniel 7, and is implicit in the imagery of Daniel 8. Daniel's concept of four successive world empires is drawn from Greek theories of mythological history. The symbolism of four metals in the statue in chapter 2 is drawn from Persian writings, while the four "beasts from the sea" in chapter 7 reflect Hosea 13:7–8, in which God threatens that he will be to Israel like a lion, a leopard, a bear or a wild beast. The consensus among scholars is that the four beasts of chapter 7, like the metals of chapter 2, symbolise Babylon, Media, Persia and the Seleucid Greeks, with Antiochus IV as the "small horn" that uproots three others (Antiochus usurped the rights of several other claimants to become king).

Daniel 2 
In chapter 2, Nebuchadnezzar dreams of a statue made of four different materials, identified as four kingdoms:
 Head of gold. Explicitly identified as King Nebuchadnezzar of Babylon (v.37–38).
 Chest and arms of silver. Identified as an "inferior" kingdom to follow Nebuchadnezzar (v.39).
 Belly and thighs of bronze. A third kingdom which shall rule over all the earth (v.39).
 Legs of iron with feet of mingled iron and clay. Interpreted as a fourth kingdom, strong as iron, but the feet and toes partly of clay and partly of iron show it shall be a divided kingdom (v. 41).

Daniel 7 
In chapter 7, Daniel has a vision of four beasts coming up out of the sea, and is told that they represent four kingdoms:
 A beast like a lion with eagle's wings (v. 4).
 A beast like a bear, raised up on one side, with three ribs between its teeth (v. 5).
 A beast like a leopard with four wings of fowl and four heads (v. 6).
 A fourth beast, with large iron teeth and ten horns (v. 7–8).

This is explained as a fourth kingdom, different from all the other kingdoms; it "will devour the whole earth, trampling it down and crushing it" (v. 23). The ten horns are ten kings who will come from this kingdom (v. 24). A further horn (the "little horn") then appears and uproots three of the previous horns: this is explained as a future king.

Daniel 8 
In chapter 8 Daniel sees a ram with two horns destroyed by a he-goat with a single horn; the horn breaks and four horns appear, followed once again by the "little horn".

Schools of thought

Rashi's interpretation
Rashi, a medieval rabbi, interpreted the four kingdoms as Nebuchadnezzar ("you are the head of gold"), Belshazzar ("another kingdom lower than you"), Alexander of Macedon ("a third kingdom of copper"), and the Roman Empire ("and in the days of these kings"). Rashi explains that the fifth kingdom that God will establish is the kingdom of the messiah.

Christian interpretation
From the time of the Protestant Reformation in the 16th century, the "four monarchies" model became widely used by all for universal history, in parallel with eschatology, among Protestants. Some continued to defend its use in universal history in the early 18th century.

Christopher Cellarius (1638–1707), based on the distinctive nature of medieval Latin. The modern historicist interpretations and eschatological views of the Book of Daniel with the Book of Revelation closely resemble and continue earlier historical Protestant interpretations.

There are references in classical literature and arts that apparently predate the use of the succession of kingdoms in the Book of Daniel. One appears in Aemilius Sura, an author quoted by Velleius Paterculus (c. 19 BC – c. AD 31). This gives Assyria, Media, Persia and Macedonia as the imperial powers. The fifth empire became identified with the Romans. (After the 17th century, the concept of a fifth monarchy was re-introduced from Christian millennarian ideas.)

An interpretation that became orthodox after Swain (1940) sees the "four kingdoms" theory becoming the property of Greek and Roman writers at the beginning of the 1st century BCE, as an import from Asia Minor. They built on a three-kingdom sequence, already mentioned by Herodotus (c. 484–425 BC) and by Ctesias (fl.  401 BC). Mendels (1981) contests this dating and origin, placing it later in the century.

Jewish Reconstructionists and Full Preterists believe that Daniel is completely fulfilled, and that the believers are now working to establish the Kingdom of God on earth.

Two main schools of thought on the four kingdoms of Daniel, are:

 the traditionalist view, supporting the conflation of Medo-Persia and identifying the last kingdom as the Roman Empire.
 the Maccabean thesis, a view that supports the separation of the Medes from the Persians and identifies the last kingdom as the Seleucid Empire.

Roman Empire schema 

The following interpretation represents a traditional view of Jewish and Christian Historicists, Futurists, Dispensationalists, Partial Preterists, and other futuristic Jewish and Christian hybrids, as well as certain Messianic Jews, who typically identify the kingdoms in Daniel (with variations) as:

 the Babylonian Empire
 the Medo-Persian Empire
 the Greek Empire
 the Roman Empire, with other implications to come later

Jerome (c.  347–420) described this scheme in his Commentary on Daniel. Within this framework there are numerous variations.

Use with the Book of Revelation 
Christian interpreters typically read the Book of Daniel along with the New Testament's Book of Revelation. The Church Fathers interpreted the beast in Revelation 13 as the empire of Rome. The majority of modern scholarly commentators understand the "city on seven hills" in Revelation as a reference to Rome.

Second temple theory 
Full Preterists, Idealists, certain Reconstructionists and other non-futurists likewise typically believe in the same general sequence, but teach that Daniel's prophecies ended with the destruction of the Second Temple of Jerusalem, and have few to no implications beyond that. Jewish and Christian Futurists, Dispensationalists, and, to some degree, Partial Preterists believe that the prophecies of Daniel stopped with the destruction of the Second Temple of Jerusalem; but will resume at some point in the future after a gap in prophecy that accounts for the Church Age.

Traditional views

Eschatological themes
For over two thousand years readers have speculated as to the meaning of the themes running through the Book of Daniel:
 The four kingdoms: In Daniel 2 Nebuchadnezzar dreams of a giant statue of four metals identified as symbolising kingdoms, and in Daniel 7 Daniel sees a vision of four beasts from the sea, again identified as kingdoms. In Daniel 8, in keeping with the theme by which kings and kingdoms are symbolised by "horns", Daniel sees a goat with a single horn replaced by four horns. Secondary symbols are involved with each: the statue is smashed by a mysterious stone which grows into a mountain, and the fourth beast has ten horns and an additional human-like horn, identified as a king. Further imagery includes Daniel 7's Son of Man (more accurately "one like a son of man), the "holy ones of the Most High", and the eternal Kingdom of God which will follow the four kingdoms and the "little horn".
Chronological predictions: Daniel predicts several times the length of time that must elapse until the coming of the Kingdom of God. A prophecy of Jeremiah is reinterpreted so that "70 years" means "70 weeks of years", and the last half of the last "week" is  defined as "a time, times, and half a time", then as 2,300 "evenings and mornings", with further numbers of days at the very end of the book.
The "anointed one cut off": Daniel 9 makes two references to an "anointed one", which has had major implications for Christian eschatology. Daniel 9:25 says: "Until there is an anointed ruler will be seven weeks"; the next verse says: "After the sixty-two weeks the anointed one shall be cut off." Scholars take these as references to the high priest Joshua from the early Persian era and to the high priest Onias III, murdered in the 2nd century, but Christians have taken them both to refer to the death of Christ, which then provides a fixed point for calculating the time to the end of the world.
The "abomination of desolation": This is mentioned in Daniel 8, 9 and 11. In the New testament this was taken to refer to the eschatological future and the destruction of Jerusalem (Matthew 24:15, Mark 13:14), and later still it was interpreted as the Antichrist.
Martydom and resurrection: Daniel 11 tells how the "wise" lay down their lives as martyrs at the end-time persecution for resurrection into the final kingdom. Daniel 3 (the story of the Fiery Furnace) and Daniel 6 (Daniel in the lions' den) were read in this light, providing a prototype for Christian martyrdom and salvation through the centuries.

Seventh-day Adventists 
The prophecy of 2,300 days in Daniel 8:14 plays an important role in Seventh-day Adventist eschatology. The 2,300 days are interpreted as 2,300 years using the day-year principle. According to the Adventist teaching, this period starts in unison with the Prophecy of Seventy Weeks in 457 BC and ends in 1844 AD. It was thought that the end of this period would bring the end of days as advocated by the Millerite movement at the turn of the 19th century.

Most Adventist groups in the Millerite tradition hold similar beliefs about the Great Apostasy, as do those of other Restorationist types of Christian faith. Some of these, most notably the Seventh-day Adventist Church, have traditionally held that the apostate church formed when the Bishop of Rome began to dominate and brought heathen corruption and allowed pagan idol worship and beliefs to come in, and formed the Roman Catholic Church, and to rest from their work on Sunday, instead of Sabbath, which is not in keeping with Scripture.

Seventh-day Adventists teach that the Little Horn Power which as predicted rose after the breakup of the Roman Empire is the papacy. In 533 AD Justinian, the emperor of the Eastern Roman Empire, legally recognized the bishop (pope) of Rome as the head of all the Christian churches. Because of the Arian domination of some of the Roman Empire by the barbarian tribes, this authority could not be exercised by the bishop of Rome. Finally, in 538 AD, Belisarius, one of Justinian's generals, routed the Ostrogoths, the last of the barbarian kingdoms, from the city of Rome and the bishop of Rome could begin establishing his universal civil authority. So, by the military intervention of the Eastern Roman Empire, the bishop of Rome became all-powerful throughout the area of the old Roman Empire.

Like many reformation-era Protestant leaders, the writings of Adventist pioneer Ellen White speak against the Catholic Church as a fallen church and in preparation for a nefarious eschatological role as the antagonist against God's true church and that the pope is the Antichrist. Many Protestant reformers such as Martin Luther, John Knox, William Tyndale and others held similar beliefs about the Catholic Church and the papacy when they broke away from the Catholic Church during the Reformation.

Ellen White writes,

Baháʼí Faith 
The Baháʼí Faith interprets the prophecy of the 2300 days and the 70 weeks in the same manner as the Seventh-day Adventists, with the period ending in the year 1844. In Baháʼí belief, 1844 marked the end of the old world and the start of the millennial period. This meant the end of the Islamic age, the end of the prophetic cycle of all religions, and the inauguration of the common era where the fulfillment of prophecies would occur for all religions. For the Baháʼí, the promise of the return of God's Messenger was fulfilled in this year by the appearance of the Báb, followed 19 years later by Baha'u'llah.

Methodists 
Methodist theologian and historicist Adam Clarke proposed an alternative to the 1844 date as used by Seventh-day Adventists and followers of Baháʼí Faith. Clarke viewed Daniel 8 as a separate vision from Daniel 7.

The traditional interpretation of the four kingdoms, shared among Jewish and Christian expositors for over two millennia, identifies the kingdoms as the empires of Babylon, Medo-Persia, Greece and Rome. This view conforms to the text of Daniel, which considers the Medo-Persian Empire as one, as with the "law of the Medes and Persians".(6:8, 12, 15) These views have the support of the Jewish Talmud, medieval Jewish commentators, Christian Church Fathers, Jerome, and Calvin.

Jerome specifically identified the four kingdoms of Daniel 2 in this way. The "four monarchies" theory existed alongside the Six Ages and the Three Eras, as general historical structures, in the work of Augustine of Hippo, a contemporary of Jerome.

The alternative view which sees the sequence ending with Greece and the Diadochi, thus excluding Rome, is not without historical precedent however. The pagan critic of Christianity, Porphyry, suggested a variation of this interpretation in the third century CE. In the following centuries, several Eastern Christians espoused this view, including Ephrem the Syrian, Polychronius, and Cosmas Indicopleustes.

During the Medieval ages the orthodox Christian interpretation followed the commentary by Jerome on the Book of Daniel. It tied the fourth monarchy and its end to the end of the Roman Empire, which was considered not to have yet come to pass (the Eastern Roman Empire persisted until 1453). This is the case for example in the tenth-century writer Adso, whose Libellus de Antichristo incorporated the characteristic medieval myth of the Last Roman Emperor. Otto of Freising used the principle of translatio imperii and took the Holy Roman Empire as the continuation of the Roman Empire (as fourth monarchy).

Protestant Reformation 

A series of Protestant theologians, such as Jerome Zanchius (1516–1590), Joseph Mede (1586–1639), and John Lightfoot (1602–1675), particularly emphasized the eschatological theory of four monarchies. Mede and other writers (such as William Guild (1586–1657), Edward Haughton and Nathaniel Stephens) expected the imminent end of the fourth empire, and a new age. The early modern version of the four monarchies in universal history was subsequently often attributed to the chronologist and astrologer Johann Carion, based on his Chronika (1532). Developments of his Protestant world chronology were endorsed in an influential preface of Philipp Melanchthon (published 1557).

The theory was topical in the 1550s. Johann Sleidan in his De quatuor imperiis summis (1556) tried to summarise the status of the "four monarchies" as historical theory; he had already alluded to it in previous works. Sleidan's influential slant on the theory was both theological, with a Protestant tone of apocalyptic decline over time, and an appeal to German nationalist feeling in terms of translatio imperii. The Speculum coniugiorum (1556) of the jurist Alonso De la Vera Cruz, in New Spain, indirectly analysed the theory. It cast doubts on the Holy Roman Emperor's universal imperium by pointing out that the historical "monarchies" in question had in no case held exclusive sway. The Carion/Melanchthon view was that the Kingdom of Egypt must be considered a subsidiary power to Babylon: just as France was secondary compared to the Empire.

The Catholic Jean Bodin was concerned to argue against the whole theory of "four monarchies" as a historical paradigm. He devoted a chapter to refuting it, alongside the classical scheme of a Golden Age, in his 1566 Methodus ad facilem historiarum cognitionem.

In 1617, sculptures representing the four kingdoms of Daniel were placed above the doors of Nuremberg town hall:

Fifth Monarchists 

In the conditions leading to the English Civil War of 1642–1651 and in the disruption that followed, many Englishmen advanced millennarian ideas, believing they were living in the "end of days". The Fifth Monarchists were a significant element of the Parliamentary grouping and, in January 1661, after Charles II had taken the throne following the English Restoration of 1660, 50 militant Fifth Monarchists under Thomas Venner attempted to take over London to start the "Fifth Monarchy of King Jesus". After the failure of this uprising, Fifth Monarchists became a quiescent and devotional part of religious dissent.

References

Further reading 
 Bernard Capp (1972), Fifth Monarchy Men: Study in Seventeenth Century English Millenarianism, Faber 
 
 
 
 Gerhard F. Hasel, "The Four World Empires of Daniel 2 Against its Near Eastern Environment," Journal for the Study of the Old Testament 1979 12: 17-30
 
 
 H. H. Rowley (1935), Darius the Mede and the Four World Empires in the Book of Daniel. A Historical Study of Contemporary Theories

External links 
 John H. Walton, "The Four Kingdoms Of Daniel," JETS 29 (1986), 25–36.
 Utopian and Historical Thinking: Interplays and Transferences (PDF)

Book of Daniel
Citation overkill